Alonzo is both a given name and a Spanish surname. Notable people with the name include:

Mononym 
Alonzo (rapper), French singer and hip hop artist, formerly Segnor Alonzo of Psy 4 de la Rime

Given name 
Alonzo de Barcena, 16th-century Spanish Jesuit missionary and linguist
Alonzo de Santa Cruz (–1567), Spanish cartographer, mapmaker, instrument maker, historian and teacher
Alonzo Babers (b. 1961), U.S. athlete
Alonzo L. Best (1854–1923), U.S. politician
Alonzo Bodden, U.S. comedian
Alonzo Church (1903–1995), U.S. mathematician and computer scientist
Alonzo Clemons, U.S. autistic savant clay sculptor
Alonzo B. Cornell (1832–1904), a Governor of New York
Alonzo Drake (1884–1919), English footballer and cricketer
Alonzo J. Edgerton (1827–1896), U.S. politician
Alonzo Dillard Folger (1888–1941), U.S. politician
Alonzo Gee, American basketball player
Alonzo A. Hinckley (1870–1936), U.S. official of the Church of Jesus Christ of Latter-day Saints
Alonzo Horton (1813–1910), developer of San Diego, California
Alonzo Lawrence (b. 1989), American football player
Alonzo C. Mather (1848–1941), founder of the Mather Stock Car Company
Alonzo J. Mathison (1876–1941) U.S. politician
Alonzo Mourning (b. 1970), U.S. basketball player
Alonzo Sargent, (fl. 1918) U.S. locomotive engineer
Alonzo Swales (1870–1952), British trade unionist
Allonzo Trier (born 1996), American basketball player
Alonzo Muhlach, Filipino actor
Alonzo Williams (born 1957), American DJ

Middle name 
Amos Alonzo Stagg (1862–1965), U.S. sports coach
Pia Wurtzbach (born 1989), Filipino beauty queen, Miss Universe 2015

Surname 
 Anne-Marie Alonzo (1951–2005), Canadian playwright, poet, novelist, critic and publisher
 Bea Alonzo (born 1987), Filipino actress and model
 Chad Alonzo, Filipino basketball player
 Chinggoy Alonzo (1950–2017), Filipino actor
 Jérôme Alonzo (born 1972), French football (soccer) player 
 John A. Alonzo (1934–2001), U.S. cinematographer
 Kely Alonzo (born 1995), Bolivian football player
 Mariano Roque Alonzo (died 1853), President of Provisional Junta of Paraguay from 9 February 1841 to 14 March 1841
 Pierre Alonzo (footballer) (born 1940), former French football player

Fictional characters
Alonzo, from Disney's 101 Dalmatians
Mr Alonzo Smith, played by Leon Ames, and Alonzo 'Lon' Smith Jr., played by Henry H. Daniels Jr., from Meet Me in St. Louis (1944)
Alonzo (cat), in T. S. Eliot's poetry and the musical CATS
Alonzo Todd, cousin of Peter Todd in the Billy Bunter books
Pierre Alonzo, a pseudonym of Richard E. Hughes

See also
Alonso
Alfonso
Lonzo

Spanish-language surnames